Surmukhi Raman (earlier called as Suchithra Raman), born on 15 September 1983 in Coimbatore, Tamil Nadu is an Indian playback singer from Tamil Nadu. She was brought up in Pune, Maharashtra. She occasionally writes lyrics.  She is one of the emerging playback singers in South India. She has done playback for more than 150 film songs in four languages including Tamil, Telugu, Malayalam and Kannada. In addition, she has recorded a number of devotionals. She has performed in numerous concerts in India and abroad.

Early life 
Surmukhi Raman completed her primary education in Pune, Maharashtra and higher education at Vyasa Vidhyalaya Matric Higher Secondary School in Chennai, Tamil Nadu. She studied at University of Madras. Her father S.V. Ramanan, who had been a semi classical singer in All India Radio, Indore, Madhya Pradesh. He had great influence on her singing career. As advised by music composer Colonial Cousins, her birth name Suchithra Raman was rechristened as Surmukhi Raman after the movie Modhi Vilayadu in order to avoid confusion with other singers who have similar names. Legendary Ghazal King Hariharan has chosen this name for her. The meaning of Surmukhi is face (Swara mukhi).

Singing career 
Surmukhi's playback singing career started in 2007 and has spanned over 15years. She started singing Light music shows at the age of 14. B.H.Abdul Hameed advised her to make her voice recorded in a cassette to distribute to the music directors.  She has sung the songs composed by all leading music directors in the film industry including Ilayaraja, A.R. Rahman, Hariharan, Bharadwaj, Vidhyasagar, Sharetth, Vijay Antony, Deva, Srikanth Deva, D. Imaan, Colonial Cousins, Jeevaraja, Vijayshankar, Taj Noor, Xavier, Manikanth Kadri, Rajini, Yuvan Shankar Raja, Ganesh Raghavendra, Nallathambi, and Shyam Balakrishnan. She has sung for more than 15 movies in Tamil and Telugu under the musical composition of Ilayaraja.   Her famous hit songs include "Pothum Otha Sollu", "Chinna Paya Vayasu", and "Paruruvayaa". Her popular song "Aandipatti Kanava Kathu" from the Tamil "film Dharamadurai garnered 26 million views on YouTube." Also her another song "Peechey Peechey" from the movie Aranmanai is featured as one of the "most popular tamil songs from the best artists" in the Tamil section of the Emirates Entertainment (In-Flight) Magazine, October 2016.

She is also a live stage performer who has performed more than 2000 orchestras. She has sung in concerts in India and abroad with the leading playback singers including S. P. Balasubrahmanyam, Mano, Hariharan, K. J. Yesudas, Chithra, Sujatha, Karthik, Srinivas, and with music directors Ilayaraja, Bharadwaj and Dhina. She has performed various star shows throughout India, Australia, Botswana, Canada, Europe, Germany, Malaysia, Middle Eastern Countries, Norway, Singapore, Sri Lanka, Switzerland, the United Kingdom, and the United States of America. She is regularly performing in Ilayaraja Shows for past 3 years. She has also sung the title tracks for few Tamil and Telugu serials including Mahalakshmi (TV series) and Bama Rukmani.

Devotional Albums 
Surmukhi Raman has been performing solo devotional Bhajan, semi classical shows in North India almost every year for past 10 years. She has sung more than 500 devotional songs, encouraged by Mr.A.C. Dinakar, one of the senior most musicians in the industry. Her famous devotional albums include Siva Kavasam & Thirupallieluchi(2009),Yoga Narasimhar (2015), Murugane Mal Murugane (2011), Kanikai Thanthidum (2017) and Mera Sairam (2019).

Voice Trainer 
Apart from playback singing, she is also appeared among the panel of Judges in the singing reality shows. 
Official voice trainer for "Sun Singer" consecutively for 4 years. 
IBC Tamil

Discography
According to popular online media musical sources, the discography of Surmukhi Raman includes.

Television Title Songs
Mahalakshmi – 2017

Theme musical composition 
Surmukhi Raman composed the theme music for Kanmani (TV series) along with Sathyan Mahalingam and Regina.

References

External links
 Movie Buff-Surmukhi
 Music India Online-Surmukhi
 Raaga.com-Surmukhi Songs

Living people
1983 births
Tamil playback singers
Tamil musicians
Women musicians from Tamil Nadu
Singers from Chennai
Kannada playback singers
Malayalam playback singers
Indian women playback singers
Telugu playback singers
21st-century Indian women singers
21st-century Indian singers
Tamil singers